SK Benátky nad Jizerou is a Czech football club located in Benátky nad Jizerou. It plays in the Bohemian Football League, the third tier of football in the country. 

Benátky was promoted to the Czech Fourth Division in June 2014. In 2015, the club was functioning as a farm team for First League side FK Mladá Boleslav.

Historical names 
 1920 – SK Benátky nad Jizerou (Sportovní klub Benátky nad Jizerou)
 1948 – DSO Sokol Karbo Benátky nad Jizerou (Dobrovolná sportovní organizace Sokol Karbo Benátky nad Jizerou)
 1953 – TJ Spartak Benátky nad Jizerou (Tělovýchovná jednota Spartak Benátky nad Jizerou)
 1973 – TJ Karbo Benátky nad Jizerou (Tělovýchovná jednota Karbo Benátky nad Jizerou)
 1993 – SK Kopaná Karbo Benátky nad Jizerou (Sportovní klub Kopaná Karbo Benátky nad Jizerou)
 2013 – SK Benátky nad Jizerou (Sportovní klub Benátky nad Jizerou)

References

External links
 Official website 

Football clubs in the Czech Republic
Association football clubs established in 1920
Benátky nad Jizerou